Micole Diana Mercurio (March 10, 1938 – January 19, 2016) was an American film and television actress and artist. Her film credits included the roles of Rosemary Szabo in Flashdance in 1983, Mrs. Kelly in Gleaming the Cube in 1989, Momma Love in The Client in 1994, Midge Callaghan in While You Were Sleeping in 1995, as well as What Lies Beneath in 2000. Mercurio's television work included guest appearances and recurring roles on Night Court, Hill Street Blues, L.A. Law, Chicago Hope and FlashForward.

Mercurio was born in Chicago, Illinois, on March 10, 1938, to Michael Mercurio and Nancy Mercurio (born De Angelo). She was married to Albert James Armonda with whom she had four children. The marriage ended in divorce. She died at her home in Santa Monica, California on January 19, 2016, at the age of 77.

Filmography

References

External links

1938 births
2016 deaths
American film actresses
American television actresses
American people of Italian descent
Actresses from Santa Monica, California
Actresses from Chicago
Burials at Woodlawn Memorial Cemetery, Santa Monica
21st-century American women